Dachs may refer to:

Badger (animal) (Melinae) or European badger (Meles meles), in German
Dachs armored engineering vehicle, based on the German Leopard 1 tank
Josef Dachs (1825–1896), Austrian pianist and music teacher
Shloime Dachs, American Hebrew language singer

See also
Badger (disambiguation)
Dach (surname)
Dachshund (German: badger dog)
Dax (disambiguation)